Hypotrachyna brasiliana is a species of foliose lichen in the family Parmeliaceae. It was originall described by William Nylander in 1885 as a species of Parmelia. Mason Hale transferred it to the new genus Hypotrachyna in 1975.

References

brasiliana
Lichen species
Lichens described in 1885
Lichens of Southeast Brazil
Taxa named by William Nylander (botanist)